is a railway station on the  Nanao Line in the city of Nanao, Ishikawa, Japan, operated by the private railway operator Noto Railway.

Lines

Station layout
The station consists of two opposed ground-level side platforms on a passing loop, connected by a level crossing. The station is unattended.

History
Nishigishi Station opened on 27 August 1932. With the privatization of Japanese National Railways (JNR) on 1 April 1987, the station came under the control of JR West. On 1 September 1991, the section of the Nanao Line from Nanao to Anamizu was separated from JR West into the Noto Railway.

Surrounding area

 Nishigishi Post Office

In fiction
Nishigishi Station served as inspiration for Yunosagi Station which features prominently in the 2011 anime Hanasaku Iroha. A symbolic Yunosagi station sign was unveiled on April 29, 2011.

See also
 List of railway stations in Japan

External links

 

Railway stations in Ishikawa Prefecture
Railway stations in Japan opened in 1932
Nanao Line
Nanao, Ishikawa